Apesia is a village in the Limassol District of Cyprus, located  southeast of Korfi. 
Although the word απαίσια in Greek when the emphasis is on the middle syllable means ugly, the name of the village is pronounced in a different way, Απαισιά and the emphasis goes on the third syllable.

Apesia was in the world news in October 2014 after the theft of a six million euro Degas painting was reported.

References

Communities in Limassol District